Kanika (Odia: କାନିକା) is an aromatic sweet rice dish. It is an Odia dish traditionally prepared during festivals and pujas. It is one of the cooked items of the 56 dishes prepared as part of Mahaprasada or Chappan Bhoga in the Jagannath Temple. It is offered to Lord Jagannath as part of the morning meal known as sakala dhupa.

It was traditionally served in Odia weddings or picnics but has largely been replaced by pulao and biryani. In West Bengal a similar dish known as misthi pulao is prepared during marriages or ceremonies which is relished with mutton curry. Kanika has a stronger flavor than misthi pulao and can be eaten with dalma or mutton curry or as dessert at the end of a meal.

The key ingredients used to make it are fragrant rice, ghee, raisins, cashews, black cardamom, green cardamom, cinnamon, cloves, mace, bay leaf, nutmeg powder, sugar, salt and turmeric.

See also

 List of rice dishes
 Bisi bele bath, a rice dish from Karnataka, India

References 

Odia cuisine
Indian rice dishes